Pals in Peril is a 1927 American silent Western film directed by Richard Thorpe and starring Jay Wilsey, Olive Hasbrouck and George Ovey.

Cast
 Jay Wilsey as Bill Gordon 
 Olive Hasbrouck as Mary Bassett 
 George Ovey as Shorty Gilmore 
 Edward Hearn as Blackie Burns 
 Robert Homans as Sheriff Kipp 
 Bert Lindley as Luther Fox 
 Harry Belmour as Hank Bassett 
 Raye Hampton as Mrs. Bassett

References

Bibliography
 Langman, Larry. A Guide to Silent Westerns. Greenwood Publishing Group, 1992.

External links
 

1927 films
1927 Western (genre) films
1920s English-language films
American black-and-white films
Pathé Exchange films
Films directed by Richard Thorpe
Silent American Western (genre) films
1920s American films